Amber Dhara is an Indian Hindi language television series that aired on Sony Entertainment Television from 24 September 2007 until 24 April 2008, based on the lives of conjoined twins, Amber and Dhara.

Plot

The story revolves around the life of conjoined twins Amber(Kashmira Irani) and Dhara(Sulagna Panigrahi), who share their liver and are conjoined at the hip. 20% of the liver is part of Amber's body and the remaining 80% is part of Dhara's body which rules out the possibility of a surgery being carried out to separate the twins without any fatality being involved in the process. The surgeon, a quack doctor who the twins' mother, Lata, consulted asserted that if the surgery is carried out, Amber will die thereby scaring her off to get any other doctor's opinion.

The girls face many obstacles and decide to run away to Mumbai to pursue Amber's dream to become a singer. Anuj, who is responsible for luring them to Mumbai, is revealed to have had bad intentions and wants the girls to join the circus. Amber and Dhara are dressed up in clownish outfits and are told that they are going to perform but instead are tricked into coming to the circus where they are made fun of. Both girls try to escape the humiliation but Anuj and his goons catch them and force the girls to stay. Amber and Dhara decide to perform one show and end up making many friends at the circus. After giving a marvelous performance, the two girls escape from the Circus. Luckily, their friend Akshat finds them and they live with him until they are able to pursue Amber's dream. They join a band but somehow end up getting arrested for the murder of Akshat's mother. Their mother comes to support them and fights the case for them, but finds out that their estranged father is fighting for the other side.

In the end, they are surgically separated from each other without any fatalities and go on to live their own lives.

Cast
 Kashmira Irani as Amber Dixit
 Sulagna Panigrahi as Dhara Dixit
 Mona Ambegaonkar as Lata Dev Shukla (Amber and Dhara's Mother)
 Sudesh Berry as Dev Shukla, (Husband of Lata Shukla)
 Paintal as Mahendra Pratap Dixit (Lata Shukla's Father)
 Harshad Chopda/Ali Merchant as Akshat Mehra (Amber/Dhara's close friend, also love-interest of Amber)
 Nasirr Khan as Anuj (Kidnapper of Amber and Dhara)
 Shweta Gulati as Sonya Jaiswal (Amber/Dhara's childhood friend)
 Himani Shivpuri as Biji (Akshat's Grandmother)
 Jaya Bhattacharya as Kamini Mehra (Akshat's Mother)
 Kamya Panjabi as Deepika (antagonist)
 Naresh Suri as Mr. Mehra (Akshat's Father)
 Vinod Singh as TK (Amber/Dhara's colleague in the band) 
 Rahul Raj Singh as Kunal (Head of the 'band' group, also love-interest of Dhara)
 Aman Verma as Shanu
 Pankaj Berry as Doctor, Lata's Friend

References

Sony Entertainment Television original programming
Indian drama television series
2007 Indian television series debuts
2008 Indian television series endings
Television series about twins
Swastik Productions television series